Aglossa rabatalis is a species of snout moth in the genus Aglossa. It was described by Joseph de Joannis in 1923 and is known from Morocco and France.

The wingspan is about 18 mm.

References

Moths described in 1923
Pyralini
Moths of Europe
Moths of Africa